Rundle College Jr/Sr High School is a private school located in Calgary, Alberta, Canada. It is located at 7375, 17th Avenue SW in Calgary.

Athletics
Rundle offers teams for the following sports:
Basketball
Football
Volleyball
Soccer
Wrestling
Golf
Cross Country Running
Badminton
Rugby
Track and Field
Weight Training
Badminton

Extra-curricular clubs
In addition to the athletic programs offered by Rundle College, there are also a number of extra-curricular clubs run by teachers and students:
Art Club
C.A.U.S.E Club (Community Volunteering)
Speech and Debate
Peer Support
Photography Club
Prefects
Reach for the Top
Robotics Club
Drama Club/Annual Production
Science Olympics
Yearbook
Business Club

Dress
Rundle College is a uniform school.  Students are expected to wear a white shirt, long or short sleeved, with a burgundy cardigan, vest, or blazer over top. Males are to wear grey trousers with an ebony belt and black dress shoes, while females are given the choice of the same pants or plaid burgundy and grey skirts.

See also
 Rundle College Society

Private schools in Alberta
Educational institutions established in 1985
1985 establishments in Alberta